, commonly referred to as All-Star Thanksgiving, is a Japanese television panel game and special program which has aired twice a year in April and October on TBS since October 1991.

In this article, the prototype  is also explained.

Format
The program features a large cast of celebrities such as actors, comedians and other tarento of around 160 to 200 people. The panel answers multiple quizzes every round until one person is deemed the winner either by elimination of those that answered incorrectly or by fastest response if there are multiple winners by the end of the round. During the program, numerous events and activities such as a mini-marathon are played by different contestants. It is a live broadcast which lasts about 5½ hours.

The winners of each quiz round and event earn a cash prize and the top overall performer at the end is considered the winner of the entire program.

This is one of the most known programs of Shinsuke Shimada and Wakako Shimazaki, especially of Wakako Shimazaki. In the program in which Wakako Shimazaki appeared, three programs All-Star Thanksgiving, Quiz! 25% Hit (its regular version) and Moero! Top Striker started in October 1991. All-Star Thanksgiving has become a masterpiece of Wakako Shimazaki, as well as Moero! Top Striker is the first anime of Wakako Shimazaki and a success story of Hikaru Kikkawa – a Japanese living abroad. The personalities of Wakako Shimazaki and Hikaru Kikkawa are incompatible, but both programs are similar in that they are "success stories".

Results

Quiz! 25% Hit 

 The time zone is from 22:00 to 23:00 every Thursday on the TBS network, as a live broadcast.
 The hosts are Shinsuke Shimada and Wakako Shimazaki.
 Rules of the quiz are the same as for the All-Star Thanksgiving, with 200 people participating in 8 groups.
 As regular participants, Jimmy Ōnishi and Shiro Suzuki. Shiro Suzuki is not the answerer in the studio, but a reporter who provides gifts from the location.
 Different from the All-Star Thanksgiving events such as mini-marathons are not inserted, and only quiz is spent.
 The content of questions is generally focused on current topics.

References

See also
 Moero! Top Striker
 A host of All-Star Thanksgiving Wakako Shimazaki sang the theme songs. The first time was October 1991 same as All-Star Thanksgiving, and the broadcast date are every Thursday same as the prototype Quiz! 25% Hit. This was from 19:30 to 20:00, TV Tokyo network.
 Samma's Super Karakuri TV
 Shiro Suzuki was appointed as the host of the Longevity Quick Push Quiz corner in the program, triggered by Quiz! 25% Hit. This was every Sunday from 19:00 to 20:00, TBS network.

Japanese game shows
1991 Japanese television series debuts
1990s Japanese television series
2000s Japanese television series
2010s Japanese television series
Japanese television specials
TBS Television (Japan) original programming